The Gay Gordons is a Scottish country dance. The usual tune was written by James Scott Skinner. It was also known as The Gordon Highlanders' March, first printed in the collectiton "Monikie Series no 3" in c 1890. Jimmy Shand made a recording of it in 1942.

Dance instructions
A standard ceilidh instruction:
Formation: couples in a circle around the room facing anti-clockwise, ladies on the right. 
Music: 2/4 or 4/4 march. E.g. "Scotland the Brave", "The Gay Gordons". 

Repeat ad lib. In order to make the dance progressive, the ladies may leave their partners between bars 12-13 and move to the partner before them in the circle.

For Scottish country dancers, the grip in the first eight bars is allemande hold.

A live demonstration was performed by the Royal Scottish Country Dancing Society  in 2007.

See also
Scottish country dance
Royal Scottish Country Dance Society
List of Scottish country dances
Chapelloise

References

External links
Additional instructions and music/video links for the Gay Gordons

Social dance
Scottish country dance